Alex McAulay (born January 20, 1977) is an American film director and novelist. McAulay is best known for writing and directing the thriller films Don't Tell a Soul and A House on the Bayou.

Career
McAulay is a former indie rock musician who recorded five albums under the pseudonym Charles Douglas, including  1999's The Lives of Charles Douglas which features Maureen Tucker from The Velvet Underground on drums, and 2004's Statecraft with Joey Santiago from The Pixies on guitars. McAulay has also written four novels: Shelter Me, Oblivion Road, Lost Summer and Bad Girls, which were published by Pocket Books/Simon & Schuster.  He also wrote and co-produced the film Flower starring Zoey Deutch, which premiered at the Tribeca Film Festival in 2017 and was released in 2018 by The Orchard. McAulay then directed, wrote and co-produced the thriller film Don't Tell a Soul, starring Jack Dylan Grazer, Fionn Whitehead and Rainn Wilson, which was a selection of the 2020 Tribeca Film Festival and premiered at the Deauville Film Festival in 2020 and was released by Saban Films and Lionsgate Films in January 2021. McAulay also wrote, directed, and co-executive produced the horror film A House on the Bayou, starring Paul Schneider, Angela Sarafyan, Jacob Lofland and Lia McHugh, which was released on November 19, 2021 by Blumhouse Television and Epix.

Filmography

Film

Acting roles

Discography
as Charles Douglas
Minor Wave - 1995
The Burdens of Genius - 1998
The Lives of Charles Douglas- 1999
Statecraft - 2004
The Lives of Charles Douglas: Remastered UK Edition - 2010
Not Your Kind Of Music - (compilation album) - 2012
Statecraft: Expanded 2 disc UK Reissue - 2017

References

1977 births
Living people
21st-century American novelists
American male novelists
21st-century American male writers